Eleanor, Fair Maid of Brittany (c. 1184 – 10 August 1241), also known as Damsel of Brittany, Pearl of Brittany, or Beauty of Brittany, was the eldest daughter of Geoffrey II, Duke of Brittany, and Constance, Duchess of Brittany. Her father, Geoffrey, was the fourth son of Henry II, King of England.

After the presumed death in 1203 of her imprisoned younger brother, Arthur, Eleanor was heiress to vast lands including England, Anjou, Aquitaine, and Brittany, realms where the Salic Law barring the accession of females did not apply. Her uncle John, King of England, was the fifth son of Henry II, and Eleanor inherited Arthur's claim to the throne as the child of John's elder brother Geoffrey. Thus she posed a potential threat to John, and following his death in 1216, equally to her cousin, King Henry III; thus, having been put in prison in 1202, she was never released. As a prisoner she was also unable to press her claim to the Duchy of Brittany as her brother's heiress.

Like Empress Matilda and Elizabeth of York, Eleanor's claim to the English throne gained little support from the barons, due to the expectation that the monarch should be male, despite legal provision for a female monarch. Some historians have commented that her imprisonment was "the most unjustifiable act of King John".

Childhood
Eleanor became fatherless at the age of two and was brought up by her uncle Richard I, King of England and grandmother Eleanor, Duchess of Aquitaine. By the death of her father she was the first in line of Breton succession, so Philip II of France asked for her wardship but Henry II took it in advance, while the birth of her posthumous brother removed her status as the first heiress.

However, being King Richard's ward also meant that she was under Angevin custody; thus even her mother Constance never considered her a potential heir to Brittany, which weakened her later claim to the duchy. Keeping her custody under Richard was probably the price for her mother to rule Brittany.

As her younger brother Arthur was the heir presumptive to England and Brittany, she was one of the most marriageable princesses. In 1190, after Richard failed to marry his younger sister Joan to Al-Adil I, brother of Saladin, he proposed that Eleanor should be the bride instead, but the negotiation was also in vain, as Al-Adil showed no interest in Christianity. In 1193, she was engaged to Frederick, son of Leopold V, Duke of Austria, as part of the conditions to release Richard, who Emperor Henry VI had taken prisoner. However, when she was on the way to Austria with Baldwin of Bethune the next year, the duke died, so the marriage never took place, and under order of Pope Celestine III she returned to England, accompanied by her grandmother Eleanor.

In summer 1195, a marriage between her and Louis, son of Philip II of France, was suggested, for an alliance between Richard and Philip, but negotiations failed again. It is said that the Emperor opposed the marriage; and the failure was also a sign that the King would replace Arthur as heir to England with his only living brother, John. This soon led to a sudden deterioration in relations between Richard and Philip. Another marriage, with Duke Odo of Burgundy, may have been suggested, for in 1198 Philip forbade Odo to marry any relatives of Richard without his permission.

Imprisonment

Under John
Upon the death of King Richard in 1199, a power struggle commenced between the supporters of 12-year-old Arthur and Richard's youngest brother, John. At the request of Constance, Eleanor was released from royal custody and united with her mother and brother in France. Eleanor was probably already under John's control when Arthur's forces were defeated and he was captured at the Battle of Mirebeau, 1 August 1202, or captured along with Arthur. Certainly, there is no mention of her capture after the battle. Arthur disappeared mysteriously while in captivity the following year. However, as Eleanor was still a potential heiress, as John then had no legitimate issue, and was at least preferable to later claimants to the throne such as Louis of France, it is unlikely that John had already decided to confine his niece for life.

On 6 December the same year, John fled Normandy taking with him Eleanor, his captive. It was said that she was initially taken to the North of England and then to Bristol, guarded by four knights. In spring 1204, Philip II of France demanded that Eleanor be released in order to marry his younger son.

Initially John organized local barons to visit Eleanor in order to prove her well-being. In 1206, John briefly detained her at Brough Castle in Westmorland (now in Cumbria), entrusting her to Robert de Vieuxpont who was its custodian, before moving her to Bowes Castle in the North Riding of Yorkshire (now in County Durham) and, finally, Corfe Castle in the Isle of Purbeck on the Dorset coast, along with 25 French knights loyal to her, guarded by Stephen de Turnham. After an attempt to escape, 22 of them were recaptured and starved to death. 

Eleanor lived in Corfe's Gloriet Tower, took her meals in the Long Hall and was allowed to walk abroad along the walls. She was allowed three maids and was provided fabric for clothes and bedding, and pocket money as much as 5 marks per quarter. She also received from John a saddle with gilded reins and scarlet ornaments, a gift which implies that she was not closely confined. John also sent her figs and almonds. A week's shopping list for Eleanor in captivity that has survived suggests the aristocratic diet at that time: Saturday: bread, ale, sole, almonds, butter, eggs. Sunday: mutton, pork, chicken and eggs. Monday: beef, pork, honey, vinegar. Tuesday. pork, eggs, egret. Wednesday: herring, conger, sole, eels, almonds and eggs. Thursday: pork, eggs, pepper, honey. Friday: conger, sole, eels, herring and almonds.

In 1208, the bishops of Nantes, Vannes, and Cornouaille attempted in vain to negotiate Eleanor's freedom. Many of her supporters were banished. Eleanor was forced to entrust Brittany and Richmond to John, who referred to her as his "dearest niece" in communicating with Bretons. As the eldest daughter of Constance, Eleanor should have been recognized as Duchess of Brittany after the death of her brother Arthur. Instead, the Breton barons, fearing John's claims to rule Brittany in representation of Eleanor's rights or to marry her to a vassal loyal to England, made her younger half-sister Alix duchess instead. Eleanor was styled Duchess of Brittany and Countess of Richmond, as successor to her brother but this was only a titular title as Alix became Duchess of Brittany in 1203 and was also styled Countess of Richmond, even making charters about this estate. 

The Breton barons, ignorant of her whereabouts, were always ready to install her as duchess in case she were released. John permitted her to use the titles of Brittany and Richmond and even talked with Breton nobles about letting her go. He had Eleanor write a letter to Breton barons and churchmen, describing her life in captivity, expressing her hope of being liberated and asking them to arrive in England to negotiate her release. This letter is the only surviving document written by Eleanor.

In 1209, William I of Scotland sent his daughters Margaret and Isobel to John as hostages to keep peace between Scotland and England, and they were also imprisoned at Corfe Castle along with Eleanor. In June 1213, John sent green robes, lambskin-trimmed cloaks, and summer slippers to the captive princesses. They were sometimes allowed to ride out under the strictest guard. Eleanor was given robes of dark green with capes of cambric and hats trimmed with miniver.

In 1213, John used Eleanor to blackmail Peter I, Duke of Brittany, husband and co-ruler with Alix, into an alliance with England, tempting him with the offer of Eleanor's Earldom of Richmond, but Peter kept loyal to France, even after John's capture at Nantes of Peter's elder brother Robert. In the same year John declared England a Papal fief, and Pope Innocent III thus claimed to be guardian of Eleanor. In February 1214, John campaigned in Aquitaine and Poitou with Eleanor, as well as his queen and Prince Richard, against Alix, hoping to get Breton support and establish Eleanor as his puppet duchess; his ambition was dashed in his defeat at the Battle of Roche-au-Moine. In July, John withdrew to England, with Eleanor still in hand. In the same year John again talked with Breton nobles about the rights and freedom of Eleanor but, after this expedition, John became convinced that he could get nothing from her claim to the Duchy; he recognized Alix as duchess of Brittany and never again supported Eleanor even in name: neither did Henry III upon his succession to the throne. 

Up to then Philip II had taken the bulk of Angevin territories, and neither Bretons nor Philip II ever positively requested the release of Eleanor, as it seemed more stable for them to have her imprisoned in England rather than become a French duchess.

The tensions between John and the Anglo-Norman barons finally began to spill over into the First Barons' War in 1215, and Louis of France led an invasion to England in support of his claim to the English throne, as husband of Blanche, a maternal granddaughter of Henry II, whilst Innocent III argued that Eleanor had a better claim than John. When Magna Carta was issued that year, it was demanded that all John's hostages including Scottish and Welsh princesses be released; Eleanor, however, was excluded.

There are different accounts of where Eleanor was held over the years. Some sources say that she was imprisoned at Corfe; others say at Bristol Castle, for all of the almost 40 years. However, the Close Rolls of Henry III confirm that Eleanor had run up a bill of £117 while imprisoned by John at Gloucester Castle.

Under Henry III
John died towards the end of the civil conflict in 1216; although according to the laws of primogeniture the claim of Eleanor was better, English barons allowed King John's young son, Henry III of England, to succeed, with the 32-year-old princess, apparently still beautiful and defiant, left imprisoned under guard by Peter de Maulay.

As her claim to England and Aquitaine was still a threat to his son, before his death John stated that Eleanor should never be released. Thus, albeit never a rallying point for English discontent during the early part of Henry III's reign, Eleanor was still held in semi-captivity, or "under a gentle house arrest", no matter how much ransom the Bretons would pay (if any attempts). Her survival was ensured according to the treaty between England and France. 

In 1218, she ceased to be styled Countess of Richmond after William Marshal, Henry's regent, recognized Peter as the Earl. Henry III styled Eleanor, now with no title left, as "king's kinswoman", or "our cousin".

In 1221, there was a rumour of a plan to rescue Eleanor and deliver her to the king of France. In 1225, Peter de Maulay was accused of planning with the king of France to get a ship to spirit the princess away, and he subsequently fell out of favour. The allegation may have been false, to discredit de Maulay and Peter des Roches, who also fell out of royal favour in spring 1234. Whether the plot existed or not, Eleanor was soon moved away from the coast. From 13 June 1222, she was transferred between Gloucester (31 July 1222 to 20 July 1223), Marlborough (20 August to 9 October 1223 and January 1224) and Bristol (before Michaelmas 1224). She was finally settled at Bristol from June 1224 for a time and was visited by Henry III. Gloucester Castle temporarily moved all its prisoners elsewhere to accommodate the princess.

Though Henry III established a law that could prevent Eleanor from legal succession to the crown and considered Eleanor would never legally inherit, from 1223 he and his government took serious actions to keep Eleanor captive. They appointed and monitored her keepers, and frequently changed them. Among her later guardians were: Engelard de Cigogné, Walter de St. Audoen, Richard de Landa, Gilbert de Greinville, Ralph Musard, Robert Lovel, and Matthew de Walop.

However, Eleanor lived and was treated as a royal princess, and it was recorded that she had her own apartments at the castles where she was imprisoned and received generous gifts from the royal family such as game, fruit, nuts, and wine. She also had proper but unshowy clothes. From 1225, she got an allowance. 

Henry III himself once sent her 50 yards of linen cloth, three wimples, 50 pounds of almonds and raisins respectively, and a basket of figs; he offered her another saddle, a proof that she could still go horse-riding; he once asked the mayor and bailiff to increase her household there. In 1230 she was provided 2 ladies-in-waiting. The governor exhibited her to the public annually, in case of rumours that the royal captive had been injured. This might suggest that the local people were sympathetic to her. Sometimes local mayor, bailiffs, responsible civilians and certain noblewomen visited her to prove her safety. She was once guarded by Peter de Rivaux, but as Rivaux lost power in 1234, both she and the castle were entrusted to William Talbot instead.  She appeared in Woodstock in November 1237. In the same year she was again kept at Gloucester Castle, again under the custody of William Talbot, with whose wife she appeared to have quarrelled. 

The sheriff, John Fitz Geoffrey, paid for her expenses. As Rivaux reconciled with Henry III, William Talbot ceased to have Gloucester Castle. On Easter or November 1238, Eleanor was transferred back to Bristol. Henry appointed two chaplains for her, one at Marlborough and the other at Bristol.

In 1235 Peter renounced Richmond and Eleanor was supposed to be offered the honour of Richmond's manor of Swaffham in Norfolk. But in 1241 Swaffham was controlled by Henry III and Eleanor only received a cash income from it by the gift of the king.

During her imprisonment for as long as 39 years, Eleanor was innocent of any crime, never tried or sentenced. She was viewed as a "state prisoner", forbidden to marry and guarded closely even after her child-bearing years.

Death and legacy
Eleanor died as a nun in 1241 at the age of 57 or 59. She was initially buried at St James' Priory, Bristol, then reburied at Amesbury Abbey, according to her wishes, announced by Henry III. She also donated her body there. Considering the association between Amesbury and the Plantagenets, Eleanor's final choice of burial place was probably a sign of submission and loyalty to her dynasty, but it may also have been her last protest about the fate of herself and her brother Arthur, as the abbey was dedicated to Virgin Mary and St Melor, a young Breton prince murdered by his wicked uncle who usurped his throne. However, neither burial place has a memorial for her remains.

The Chronicle of Lanercost claims that the remorseful Henry III had given a gold crown to Eleanor to legitimize himself and his descendants shortly before her death, and only three days later the crown was donated to young Prince Edward (the future Edward I of England) as a gift. Another version says that she only wore the crown for one day before returning it.

The Annales Londonienses recorded the event of her death, referring to her as "Alienora quondam comitis Britanniæ filia, in custodia diuturni carceris strictissime reservata" (in English: "Eleanor, the daughter of the late Count of Brittany, long established in the custody of the strictest prison reserved"), and noted that she was the rightful heir to England, although some years after her death Henry III was still unwilling to admit that he was initially not the hereditary king of England. The Annals of Tewkesbury record the death "IV Id Aug" in 1241 of "Alienora de Britannia consanguinea domini regis Henrici Angliæ" (in English: "Eleanor of Brittany a blood relative of the lord King Henry of England"). The Chronicle of Lanercost recorded Eleanor as being a most beautiful, determined, and tactful woman. The limited sources about her character are consistent with this assessment and suggest that she was never resigned to her fate, as even decades of confinement could not force her to relinquish her rights although there was little hope of their being fulfilled. The bailiffs there were commanded to provide tapers and alms for her obsequies. Tapers, alms and candles for her obsequies totalled £20 7s.

In 1246, Henry III endowed a chaplain to say masses daily for her soul; In 1268, Henry III gave the manor of Melksham, Wiltshire, a place that Eleanor had been fond of, to Amesbury for the souls of Eleanor and Arthur. Thus Eleanor became a benefactress to the abbey.

Portrayals

Nobody made Eleanor the heroine of any prose or poem for a long time, and the first academic article with her as its heroine did not come into existence until 1907.

Eleanor sometimes appears in historical fiction, for example, in Mary Robinson's Angelina (1796). In Thomas Costain's novel Below the Salt, the author has Eleanor escape, marry a knight with land in Ireland, and raise a family there. The series Through a Dark Mist, In the Shadow of Midnight, and The Last Arrow by Marsha Canham was also about the rescue of the princess, all suggesting that William Marshal also wanted Eleanor to be liberated. Eleanor also appeared in the novels Here Be Dragons by Sharon Kay Penman, Sirocco Wind from the East by Virginia Ann Work, and as the heroine in The Shimmering Sky by Rik Denton. Eleanor's life story is also told in first person in The Captive Princess by J.P. Reedman.

In her poem The Lament of Eleanor of Bretagne, the Victorian English novelist and poet Menella Bute Smedley imagined Eleanor's melancholy feelings as she aged under weary imprisonment.

Sources

References

Notes

1180s births
1241 deaths
12th-century Breton women
13th-century Breton women
12th-century English nobility
13th-century English nobility
12th-century English women
13th-century English women
House of Plantagenet
Earls of Richmond (1136 creation)
Richmond
French people imprisoned abroad
French people who died in prison custody
English people who died in prison custody
Prisoners and detainees of England and Wales
Burials at St James' Priory, Bristol
Burials at Amesbury Abbey
Anglo-Normans
French prisoners of war in the 13th century